Siikajoki is a municipality of Finland. It is part of the North Ostrobothnia region. The municipality has a population of 
which 
is water. The population density is
. Neighbour municipalities are Hailuoto, Liminka, Lumijoki, Raahe and Siikalatva.

The municipality is unilingually Finnish.

History

The current municipality of Siikajoki consists of three previous municipalities of Paavola and Revonlahti, that were merged into the municipality of Ruukki in 1973, and the municipality of Siikajoki founded in 1868. The municipalities of Ruukki and Siikajoki were disbanded and replaced by the new municipality of Siikajoki on January 1, 2007.

Settlements 

 Luohuan Ylipää

Notable people
 Matti Asunmaa (1921–1998)
 Väinö Huhtala (1935-2016)

See also
 Battle of Siikajoki
 Battle of Revolax

References

External links

 Municipality of Siikajoki – Official website
 Siikajokilaakso magazine

 
Populated places established in 1868
Populated coastal places in Finland